Slim Shady EP is the first and to date only extended play by American rapper Eminem, released on December 10, 1997, through the Detroit-based record label Web Entertainment.  Unlike his debut album Infinite, Slim Shady EP helped Eminem gain the interest of CEO Jimmy Iovine (co-founder of Interscope Records) and West Coast hip-hop producer Dr. Dre, who subsequently signed Eminem to his Aftermath Entertainment record label, and served as executive producer on his major-label debut album The Slim Shady LP (1999).

The EP introduces Eminem's alter ego Slim Shady. Since the EP was released before he was signed to Interscope and Aftermath, original copies are now highly valued. His lyrics are a marked departure from those found on Infinite, featuring constant references to drug use, sexual acts, mental instability, and over-the-top violence. Another departure was his exploration of more serious themes of dealing with poverty, his direct and self-deprecating response to criticism, and of marital and family difficulties. His flow is also noticeably different from Infinite where critics claimed he sounded too much like Nas and AZ. Eminem also began utilizing story telling on this EP. The production value of the music on the tracks — from previous collaborators DJ Head, The Bass Brothers, and Mr. Porter — was also noticeably higher than on prior album efforts. According to Billboard, at this point in his life Eminem had "realized his musical ambitions were the only way to escape his unhappy life".

Background and production
In 1996, his debut album Infinite, which was recorded at the Bassmint, a recording studio owned by the Bass Brothers, was released under their independent label Web Entertainment. Infinite achieved little commercial success and was largely ignored by Detroit radio stations, such as WJLB (97.9 FM in Detroit), and in specific tracks Eminem raps explicitly about this problem, like in "Just Don't Give a Fuck" "If I Had" and "Low Down, Dirty". The disappointment from this experience greatly influenced his lyrical style: "After that record, every rhyme I wrote got angrier and angrier. A lot of it was because of the feedback I got. Motherfuckers was like, 'You're a white boy, what the fuck are you rapping for? Why don't you go into rock & roll?' All that type of shit started pissing me off." After the release of Infinite, Eminem's personal struggles and abuse of drugs and alcohol culminated in a suicide attempt: all these troubles became main themes of Slim Shady EP.

The disappointment of Infinite inspired Eminem to create the alter ego Slim Shady: "Boom, the name hit me, and right away I thought of all these words to rhyme with it". Slim Shady served as Eminem's vent for his frustrations, and in 1997, he released the horrorcore extended play entitled Slim Shady EP simultaneously on cassette, vinyl, and CD. During this time, Eminem and his wife Kim Scott lived in a high-crime neighborhood with their newborn daughter Hailie, where their house was burglarized numerous times.  After being evicted from his home, Eminem traveled to Los Angeles to participate in the Rap Olympics, an annual nationwide rap battle competition.  He placed second, and the staff at Interscope Records who attended the Rap Olympics sent a copy of the Slim Shady EP to company CEO Jimmy Iovine. Iovine played the tape for record producer Dr. Dre, founder of Aftermath Entertainment.  Dr. Dre recalled, "In my entire career in the music industry, I have never found anything from a demo tape or a CD. When Jimmy played this, I said, 'Find him. Now.'" Eminem and Dr. Dre subsequently began work on his major-label debut album The Slim Shady LP.

Artwork
The cover depicts the opening intro as well as the first track, in which Slim Shady awakens Eminem and orders him to look in the mirror to see that he is "nothing without him". Eminem resists and screams in the background while Slim Shady yells back and laughs at Eminem's horror. By the second track, Eminem and Slim Shady become the same person. Eminem is also ordered by "Slim Shady" to look into the mirror, and the sound of glass breaking is heard, alluding once again to the cover. The art also bears a similarity to Black Flag's 1981 debut album, Damaged.

Release and reception
According to an interview with Zane Lowe, Eminem made 500 copies of the EP, but sold only slightly higher than 250. Though rare, reviews of the EP were generally mixed to positive. AllMusic gave the EP two and a half out of five stars without a written review. XXL, despite originally giving the EP three out of five stars "L" rating, listed it on their "100 Most Essential Rap EPs of All Time – The Best of the Short & Sweet" list. Eminem was featured in the March 1998 edition of The Source magazine's (#102), "Unsigned Hype" column. The author of the column highlighted two tracks from Eminem's Slim Shady EP: "Just the Two of Us", and "Murder, Murder".

Track listing

References 

1997 debut EPs
Eminem EPs
Albums produced by Mr. Porter
Web Entertainment albums